Bachmann Branchline is a British OO gauge model railway brand manufactured by Bachmann Europe PLC, a subsidiary of Bachmann Industries, and is used for British outline OO scale model railways. 

Bachmann, a US company founded in 1835, was purchased by Kader Industries in 1987. Kader had previously produced models for Palitoy under the Mainline brand. Palitoy required its manufacturers to produce and retain ownership of the toolings and Kader had used the toolings and added new ones for models commissioned by Replica Railways following the demise of Mainline.

Kader formed Bachmann Europe PLC in 1989 with its main UK headquarters in Moat Way, Barwell, and the following year launched the Bachmann Branchline range for the British market with the moulds that had previously been used for Mainline Railways and Replica. From this starting point Bachmann has developed the range further and now produce a large range of models competing in particular with Hornby.

In 2000, Bachmann Europe PLC bought Graham Farish, an N gauge manufacturer, and since then many of its models have been made available in both gauges.

Items 

Bachmann is known for its consistent quality of model trains . Many of its trains include NEM pockets, making it possible to replace standard tension lock coupling with close couplings such as Kadees or screw link couplings.

Models produced 
 
The following locomotive models have been produced, or announced by Bachmann Branchline:

Diesel locomotives

Electric locomotives

Diesel multiple units

Electric multiple units

Steam Locomotives

OO9 Gauge Steam Locomotives

OO9 Gauge Diesel Locomotives

Rivals 

Hornby Railways - Bachmann and Hornby are the two largest OO manufacturers
Dapol - Produces wagons in OO
Heljan - Produces a number of locomotives and wagons
Oxford Rail - Produces OO scale locos and wagons
Vi Trains - Recently started producing OO locomotives
Rapido Trains UK - Recently started producing OO locomotives in the UK Market
Accurascale - Recently started producing OO locomotives

References 

[1] See articles in 'Model Railway Enthusiast', 1999-2000.

External links 
 Bachmann Branchline pages on the Bachmann Europe website

Bachmann Industries
Model railroad manufacturers
Model manufacturers of the United Kingdom